The Church of St Benet Paul's Wharf is a Welsh Anglican church in the City of London. Since 1556, it has also been the official church of the College of Arms in which many officers of arms have been buried. In 1666 it was destroyed in the Great Fire of London, after which it was rebuilt and merged with nearby St Peter's. The current church was designed by Sir Christopher Wren. It is one of only four churches in the City of London to escape damage during World War II.

History
St Benet's traces its history back to the year 1111, when a church was built on the site and dedicated to St Benedict. Over time the name was abbreviated to St. Benet. To the west of the site was the watergate of Baynard's Castle, which is referenced in the biographies of Queen Anne Boleyn and Lady Jane Grey. Both the church and the castle were destroyed in the Great Fire of London in 1666. It was redesigned by the architect Christopher Wren, and reopened in 1683. The builder was Edward Strong the Elder.

On 2 March 1706, Henrietta Hobart married Charles Howard, 9th Earl of Suffolk, a captain in the 6th (Inniskilling) Dragoons there. (Henrietta Howard subsequently became mistress to the future King George II.)

The church was narrowly saved from destruction in the late 19th century, when its parish was merged with that of St Nicholas Cole Abbey. After an energetic campaign by its supporters, Queen Victoria in 1879 granted the church to Welsh Anglicans for services. St Benet's continues as London's Metropolitan Welsh church, with its services conducted in the Welsh language, and with English translation provided.

Present day
In 2008 the church was closed for a few months due to a "dwindling congregation" but reopened in time for the carol service in December that year. Services are held weekly on Sunday mornings at 11am, with occasional special services on Sunday afternoons at 3pm. The church can be toured on Thursdays between 11am and 3pm.

The parish is within the Conservative Evangelical tradition of the Church of England, and it has passed resolutions to reject the ordination of women and/or female leadership.

Exterior
The church is of dark red brick, with alternating courses of Portland stone at the corners. The tower is situated to the north-west of the nave and is capped by a small lead dome, lantern and simple short spire.

Interior

The interior is almost a square. Unusually for a Wren church, the ceiling is flat rather than domed or barrel-vaulted. The north gallery was formerly used by the Doctors' Commons, and is now used by the College of Arms. Most of the original 17th-century furnishings are still intact, including the magnificent altar table, reredos and pulpit, designed by Grinling Gibbons. The lectern and baptismal font are also original.

The galleries are supported by Corinthian columns. There is a memorial to Inigo Jones, who was buried in the previous church,  and a medallion bust of Sir Robert Wyseman, a benefactor of St Benet's who died in 1684.

Officers of arms buried in the church
Hon. Sir George Rothe Bellew, Garter
Sir Ralph Bigland, Garter
Sir Anthony Richard Wagner, Garter
Sir Gilbert Dethick, Garter
Sir Henry St George, Garter
John Riddell Bromhead Walker, Clarenceux
George Drewry Squibb, Norfolk
Rodney Onslow Dennys, Somerset
Major Francis Jones, Wales
John Philipot, Somerset
John Charles Brooke, Somerset

See also

Church in Wales
The College of Arms
List of churches and cathedrals of London
List of Christopher Wren churches in London

References

External links

 Church website
 St Benet Paul's Wharf from Friends of the City Churches
 360° panorama inside the church

Buildings and structures completed in 1683
17th-century Church of England church buildings
Heraldic sites
Christopher Wren church buildings in London
Churches in the City of London
English Baroque church buildings
Grade I listed churches in the City of London
Rebuilt churches in the United Kingdom
Diocese of London
1683 establishments in England
Welsh language
Conservative evangelical Anglican churches in England
Church of England church buildings in the City of London